Ross is an unincorporated community in Converse County, Wyoming, United States.

References

Unincorporated communities in Wyoming
Unincorporated communities in Converse County, Wyoming